The 2012–13 Idaho Vandals men's basketball team represented the University of Idaho during the 2012–13 NCAA Division I men's basketball season. The Vandals, led by fifth year head coach Don Verlin, played their home games at the Cowan Spectrum, with a few early season games at Memorial Gym, and were members of the Western Athletic Conference. they finished the season 12–18, 7–11 in WAC play to finish in sixth place. They lost in the quarterfinals of the WAC tournament to New Mexico State.

Roster

Schedule

|-
!colspan=9| Exhibition

|-
!colspan=9| Regular Season

|-
!colspan=9| WAC tournament

References

Idaho Vandals
Idaho Vandals men's basketball seasons
Idaho
Idaho